The White River Conference was an IHSAA-sanctioned conference located within rural areas of East Central Indiana, that existed twice, once from 1954 to 1977, and from 1989 to 2010. The first version of the conference was founded as a home for high schools in Madison County who weren't in the Central Indiana Athletic Conference. The conference would expand quickly from six to nine schools, as two new high schools in Anderson and Middletown, a school in Henry County, were added within two years. Membership was generally not stable until 1969, as Madison Heights left, Highland was forced out and eventually added back into the conference, St. Mary's closed, member schools consolidated, and schools from neighboring Delaware and Hancock counties were added. Eventually, large disparities in enrollment causing the conference to disband, as city and consolidated schools outgrew their rural counterparts.. Schools would move into the Big Blue River Conference, Classic Athletic Conference, and Mid-Eastern Conference.

The conference was refounded in 1989, with virtually the same lineup as 1977. Pendleton Heights and Yorktown had been independent since the demise of the CAC, and Mount Vernon had been independent since the original WRC folded. Lapel and Shenandoah were left without a home with the breakup of the BBRC, while Frankton and Wes-Del were eager to join a conference that sponsored football (they played independently since the MEC does not sponsor the sport). Anderson Highland was the only member who did not rejoin, as their move to the Olympic Conference caused the demise of the CAC. Delta, another former CAC school, would take their place in the reformed conference, and divisions in football were introduced to address enrollment disparity.

This lineup would remain intact until 1995, though a massive change would happen in the next three years as five schools left. Delta, Mount Vernon, and Pendleton Heights would all leave for the Hoosier Heritage Conference, while Yorktown would join the Rangeline Conference before also ending up in the HHC. Frankton would join the more geographically compact Central Indiana Athletic Conference in 1998, joining fellow northern Madison County schools Alexandria and Elwood. The WRC countered by adding two former BBRC schools: Knightstown (1995) and Eastern Hancock (1997). While the number of members in the conference shrank, its five members were of similar size and demographic. The conference remained stable for the next decade.

The end of the conference began when Wes-Del left after the 2007-08 academic year to rejoin the MEC. Lapel then joined the Indiana Crossroads Conference in 2009-10, playing in both conferences for the season before becoming a full member of the ICC for 2010-11. The three remaining schools afterward became independents. Eastern Hancock and Knightstown would join the Mid-Hoosier Conference and its football arm, the Mid-Indiana Football Conference, after being independent for a few years. The school's have since left and joined the Mid-Eastern Conference (where Shenandoah will join them, having been independent since the demise of the WRC) and Tri-Eastern Conference, respectively, in 2017. Lapel struggled to compete in the ICRC, and left that conference in 2014, playing independently since then.

Former Membership (1989-2010) 

 Lapel played the 2009-10 season concurrently in the WRC and ICRC.

Football Divisions 1989-1995

Former Membership (1954-1977) 

 Wes-Del played concurrently in the WRC and MVC for its entire duration in the first incarnation of the WRC.

Membership timeline

References

Resources 
 IHSAA Conferences
 IHSAA Directory

Indiana high school athletic conferences
High school sports conferences and leagues in the United States
Indiana High School Athletic Association disestablished conferences
1954 establishments in Indiana
2010 disestablishments in Indiana